Justin Brown may refer to:

Justin Brown (aquanaut), American professional aquanaut
Justin Brown (defensive lineman) (born 1982), American gridiron football defensive end
Justin Brown (diplomat), Australian diplomat
Justin Brown (politician), Missouri State Senator
Justin Brown (rower) (1904–1933), British rower
Justin Brown (wide receiver) (born 1991), American gridiron football wide receiver
Justin Brown (author), New Zealand author

See also
C. Justin Brown, American defense attorney